The 7th AARP Movies for Grownups Awards, presented by AARP the Magazine, honored films released in 2007 made by people over the age of 50. The ceremony was held on February 4, 2008 at the Bel Air Hotel in Los Angeles, and was hosted by actors Jamie Lee Curtis and John Cleese. Hal Holbrook won the annual Career Achievement Award, and Gena Rowlands won the award for Breakthrough Achievement for her writing in Paris, je t'aime.

Three new awards debuted at this year's ceremony, honoring the best supporting actor, best supporting actress, and best buddy picture of the year.

Awards

Winners and Nominees

Winners are listed first, highlighted in boldface, and indicated with a double dagger.

Career Achievement Award
 Hal Holbrook: "'This is one of the greatest moments of my life!' the veteran star said, ranking it right up there with his Oscar nomination that year — his first — for Into the Wild."

Breakthrough Accomplishment
 Gena Rowlands: "Rowlands, who'd never written a screenplay in her life, sat down and created an exquisite scene, the story of a long-married couple on the eve of their divorce. Sparely written and wonderfully realized by director Gerard Depardieu, the scene creates in the viewer the discomfort of overhearing a too private conversation in too public a place."

Films with multiple nominations and wins

References

AARP Movies for Grownups Awards
AARP
AARP